Parappa is a village in Vellarikundu taluk of Kasaragod district in Indian state of Kerala.

Location
Parappa is located 7 km west of Vellarikundu on Odayanchal-Cherupuzha road, 24 km east of Kanhangad and 44 km south east of District headquarters Kasaragod.

Administration

Parappa is a village in Balal Grama Panchayat. Parappa Block Panchayat has administration over 7 Grama Panchayats like Balal, East eleri, Kallar, Kinanoor-Karindalam, Kodom-Belur, Panathady and West eleri. Parappa village is politically a part of Kanhangad (State Assembly constituency) which belongs to Kasaragod (Lok Sabha constituency).

Demographics
As of 2011 Census, Parappa village had total population of 14,137 which constitutes 6,834 males and 7,303 females. The sex ratio of Parappa was 1068 lower than state average of 1084. Population in the age group 0-6 was 1,542 (10.9%) where 793 are males and 749 are females. Parappa had overall literacy of 88.3%, lower than state average of 94%. Male literacy stands at 92.1% and female literacy was 84.8%.

References

Villages in Kasaragod district